Henry Chapman (7 January 1868 – 5 May 1942) was an Australian cricketer. He played in two first-class matches for Queensland between 1895 and 1902.

See also
 List of Queensland first-class cricketers

References

External links
 

1868 births
1942 deaths
Australian cricketers
Queensland cricketers
Sportspeople from Tredegar
Cricketers from Blaenau Gwent